The comic book stories published by Marvel Comics since the 1940s have featured several noteworthy concepts besides its fictional characters, such as unique places and artifacts. Since the introduction of Peter Parker as a character in 1962, with the superhero alter-ego, Spider-Man, a number of these locations have been prominently featured in connection with storylines specific to this character. These have then been carried over to depictions of Spider-Man in film, video games, and other media. There follows a list of those features.

Residences
 Aunt May's house: Located at 20 Ingram Street, Forest Hills, Queens, nearly every depiction of Spider-Man begins with Parker living with his Aunt May and Uncle Ben (or just his Aunt May, where Uncle Ben is already shown as being deceased). The house is sometimes depicted as being next door to the home of Mary Jane Watson. Storylines have occurred in various comic book runs and other media where Aunt May's home is attacked. In the 2018 American computer-animated film, Spider-Man: Into the Spider-Verse, a shed in the backyard leads to a secret underground lair where Parker (deceased in that universe) had kept a variety of costumes and technology. In the 1981 TV cartoon, Spider-Man and His Amazing Friends, the house serves as the Spider-Friends' headquarters, though Aunt May remains unaware of their activities.

Companies
 Daily Bugle: A newspaper headquartered in a building where Parker works as a photographer for J. Jonah Jameson.
 Oscorp Tower: A research company headquartered in a skyscraper owned by Norman Osborn, which later became the headquarters for Alchemax.
 Parker Industries: A company that was founded and owned by Parker.

Educational institutions

Empire State University
Empire State University (ESU) is a fictional university whose alumni include Peter Parker (Spider-Man), Harry Osborn, Gwen Stacy, Emma Frost, and Johnny Storm (the Human Torch).  Doreen Green (Squirrel Girl) is currently enrolled in its computer science undergraduate program.

Midtown High School

Midtown High School (also known as Midtown Science High School or the Midtown School of Science and Technology) is a fictional school appearing in American comic books published by Marvel Comics. The school is depicted as being located in Queens, NYC. It is commonly depicted as the high school of Peter Parker, Flash Thompson, Liz Allan, Cindy Moon, and others in comic books and other media.

In live-action films, the Midtown School of Science and Technology appears in the Sony Pictures films Spider-Man (2002), The Amazing Spider-Man (2012) and The Amazing Spider-Man 2 (2014), as well as the Marvel Cinematic Universe films Spider-Man: Homecoming (2017), Avengers: Endgame (2019), Spider-Man: Far From Home (2019), and Spider-Man: No Way Home (2021).

History
The fictional school is located in Forest Hills in New York City, New York. The school first appeared in Amazing Fantasy #15 by Stan Lee and Steve Ditko. According to comic book historian Peter Sanderson, Lee based the fictional school on Forest Hills High School in New York City. In the Tom Holland Spider-Man films, the Midtown High School closely resembles an actual elite NYC public high school: the Bronx High School of Science. Director Jon Favreau is an alumnus of Bronx Science.

Faculty

Students

Other versions

Ultimate Spider-Man
Midtown High School appears in Ultimate Spider-Man. Just like the mainstream comics, it depicts Peter, Flash and Liz Allan as students. Unlike the mainstream comic book, characters such as Gwen Stacy, Eddie Brock, Mary Jane Watson and Harry Osborn also debut in the high school instead of the Empire State University. X-Men member Kitty Pryde is also depicted as attending the high school. The comic also depicts a new character called Kenny "King Kong" McFarlane, who is depicted as best friend of Flash in high school. Mark Raxton is also depicted as a student who attends Midtown High school.

Spider-Man Loves Mary Jane
Midtown High School appears in Spider-Man Loves Mary Jane. Student faculty includes Peter Parker, Mary Jane Watson, Liz Allan, Flash Thompson, Harry Osborn and Gwen Stacy. Felicia Hardy appears as a tough transfer student. Jessica Jones was a former friend of Mary Jane's who, surprisingly became a goth girl. Luke Cage has a surprising and brief cameo where he flirts with Mary Jane. Ned Leeds and Betty Brant are older students with the former being Mary Jane's ex-boyfriend. A new character named Lindsay Leighton is the school's drama queen who envies Mary Jane's acting ability.

In other media

Television
 Midtown High School is a major recurring setting in The Spectacular Spider-Man. Unlike most other depictions, this version of the school appeared to be located in Midtown Manhattan judging from Spider-Man's commute in an earlier episode. The series debuts both Principal Davis (voiced by Kevin Michael Richardson) and Aaron Warren (voiced by Brian George) in other media. Other staff included are the class's coach Coach Smith (voiced by Kevin Michael Richardson), and the theater teacher St. John Devereaux (voiced by Jeff Bennett). The recurring students depicted in the series are Peter Parker, Gwen Stacy, Flash Thompson, Liz Allan, Sally Avril, Kenny "King Kong", Hobie Brown, Rand Robertson, Glory Grant, Harry Osborn, Mary Jane Watson, Sha Shan Nguyen and Mark Allan. Eddie Brock was also a graduate of the school before attending Empire State University. The series also debuts students from the comics Seymour O'Reilly (voiced by Steve Blum) and "Tiny" McKeever.
 Midtown High School appears in Ultimate Spider-Man. S.H.I.E.L.D. Director Nick Fury appointed S.H.I.E.L.D. Agent Phil Coulson to be the Acting Principal. Another notable staff member is a janitor named Stan (voiced by Stan Lee) who is one of the original S.H.I.E.L.D. Agents. During Season Three, Stan becomes the Acting Principal at the time when Phil Coulson was away on a special mission.
 Midtown High School is featured in Marvel's Spider-Man. Its known teachers include assistant chemistry teacher Anna Maria Marconi and science teacher Sal Salerno (voiced by Sean Schemmel in season one, Phil LaMarr in season two).

Film

Spider-Man and The Amazing Spider-Man film series
 Midtown High School appears in the 2002 feature film Spider-Man, where Parker is depicted as a high school senior until graduation. Both he and Harry Osborn appear as best friends while Flash Thompson is depicted as the class bully. Instead of Liz Allan, Mary Jane Watson is depicted as Peter's high school crush and once girlfriend of Flash. Allan does appear in the film, but is only named in the novelization. It is mentioned that Harry had to go there after flunking out of many private schools.
 Midtown Science High School appears in The Amazing Spider-Man and The Amazing Spider-Man 2 along with the viral marketing of the films. The students in the film are Peter Parker, Flash Thompson, Gwen Stacy, Sally Avril and a shy student named Missy Kallenback (portrayed by Hannah Marks).

Marvel Cinematic Universe
 In Spider-Man: Homecoming, Midtown School of Science and Technology is introduced. Peter Parker is a sophomore and his classmates include Ned Leeds, Flash Thompson, Betty Brant, Jason Ionello, Liz Toomes, Cindy Moon, Seymour O'Reilly, Tiny McKeever, Charles Murphy, Abe Brown, Sally Avril, and a new character named Michelle (portrayed by Zendaya) whose nickname is revealed to be MJ. The school is a STEM school with many of Peter's classmates, who are usually depicted as being unenthusiastic about science, being depicted as science graduates. Faculty includes Roger Harrington (portrayed by Martin Starr; same character was seen in a brief cameo in The Incredible Hulk); Coach Wilson (portrayed by Hannibal Buress), Mr. Cobbwell (portrayed by Tunde Adebimpe), Monica Warren (portrayed by Selenis Leyva) and Barry Hapgood (portrayed by John Penick), the shop class teacher. The school's principal is Principal Morita (portrayed by Kenneth Choi), who is shown to be a descendant of Howling Commandos member Jim Morita, also portrayed by Choi in previous MCU media.
 In Avengers: Endgame, the school is seen when Parker and Leeds return from the Blip and have an emotional reunion.
 In Spider-Man: Far From Home, the school's daily news footage shows students returning from the Blip while recognizing the Avengers and those who died for their actions. A new teacher named Julius Dell (portrayed by J. B. Smoove) is introduced as well as new students Brad Davis (portrayed by Remy Hii), Zach Cooper (portrayed by Zach Barack), and Josh Scarino (portrayed by Joshua Sinclair-Evans). Other students include Zoha Rahman, Yasmin Mwanza, Tyler Luke Cunningham, and Sebastian Viveros whose characters are named after them. It is revealed that a majority of Parker's classmates from Spider-Man: Homecoming survived the Blip and had already graduated with only Parker himself, Ned Leeds, MJ, Flash Thompson, Betty Brant and Jason Ionello among main characters having been blipped and then brought back.
 In Spider-Man: No Way Home, the school addresses Parker's identity as Spider-Man as the teachers created a shrine dedicated to him, presenting it to Parker on his return to school. After the first day back, Parker, Leeds, and Jones meet on the school’s rooftop and discuss colleges together. Later, Parker goes to the school to mourn the death of his aunt at the hands of the Green Goblin, and is met by Leeds and Jones, who introduce him to alternate variants of himself, who had arrived through the fractured multiverse. He and his variants work in the school’s laboratory to concoct cures for the other universe-displaced before leaving, while Leeds and Jones remain with the mystical Macchina de Kadavus. Leeds uses a Sling Ring to open an inter-dimensional portal, which accidentally allows the universe-displaced Lizard to come through and attack them in the school. Parker arrives to fight the Lizard off, as Leeds and Jones flee the school through another portal, followed by the Lizard and Parker.
 An alternate version of Midtown High will be a recurring setting in the upcoming animated series Spider-Man: Freshman Year and its second season Sophomore Year. Alongside Parker himself, the student body will comprise characters such as Amadeus Cho, Nico Minoru and Harry Osborn.

Institutions

Ravencroft
Ravencroft Institute for the Criminally Insane was a maximum-security asylum for the mentally ill. Many insane murderers and supervillains were kept at Ravencroft.

The institute was first mentioned in Web of Spider-Man #112, written by Terry Kavanagh.

The institute is officially opened in Web of Spider-Man Annual #10 (1994). The institute is featured in a number of Spider-Man storylines. Dr. Ashley Kafka was the founder and first director of Ravencroft. John Jameson was head of security. Both were fired in The Spectacular Spider-Man #246 and Dr. Leonard Samson became Ravencroft's new director. In Leonard Samson's next appearance, he owned a private practice instead of running the institute.

The institute reappeared in Vengeance of the Moon Knight. In this incarnation, it housed mostly non-superpowered psychopaths and had an imposing metal front gate with a Gothic facade similar to DC's Arkham Asylum.

Known patients at Ravencroft include Carnage, Chameleon, D.K., Doctor Octopus, Electro, Green Goblin, Gale, Jackal, Massacre, Mayhem, Mysterio, Prism, Pyromania, Ramon Grant, Shriek, Venom, Vulture, and Webber.

The storyline after Absolute Carnage, Ruins of Ravencroft eventually explains its true origin. It turns out that the institute is more than just for the criminally insane. It used to act as a staging area for superhuman experiments, particularly supernaturals such as for Dracula in centuries ago prior to being raided by Captain America-Steve Rogers and Bucky (now a Winter Soldier in the present) during World War II in the 20th century.

Ravencroft in other media
 Ravencroft appears in Spider-Man.
 Ravencroft appears in The Spectacular Spider-Man, with Electro, Doctor Octopus, Cletus Kasady, John Jameson, and Venom as known patients.
 Ravencroft appears in The Amazing Spider-Man 2, with Dr. Ashley Kafka as a leading scientist and Electro as a patient until Harry Osborn breaks him out.
 Ravencroft also appears in the tie-in video game of the same name, in which Oscorp uses it to conduct secret experiments.
 Ravencroft appears in Venom: Let There Be Carnage, with Shriek as a prominent inmate.

References

External links
 Midtown High School at Marvel.com
 Midtown High School at Marvel Wiki
 Midtown High School at Comic Vine

Spider-Man
Marvel Comics locations
Queens, New York, in fiction